Abhay Joshi (born 17 August 1983) is an Indian cricketer. He made his first-class debut for Mizoram in the 2018–19 Ranji Trophy on 7 January 2019.

References

External links
 

1983 births
Living people
Indian cricketers
Mizoram cricketers
Place of birth missing (living people)